Doctor Who: 30 Years at the BBC Radiophonic Workshop is a 1993 album celebrating the 30th anniversary of popular BBC science-fiction series Doctor Who, which had been taken off the air four years previous. The compilation featured a selection of sound-effects and atmospheres from throughout the history of the programme as well as a sample of music from the 1993 BBC Radio production "The Paradise of Death". It also collected four versions of the memorable theme music, including the first official release of the unused 1972 "Delaware" version.

Track listing

External links
Album details

BBC Radiophonic Workshop albums
30 Years at the BBC Radiophonic Workshop
1993 compilation albums
Sound effects albums